Petar Planić (born 16 March 1989) is a Serbian professional footballer who plays as a centre-back for Canadian Soccer League club Serbian White Eagles.

Club career

Serbian SuperLiga 
He started with the local club Metalac Kraljevo. In 2009, he arrived at OFK Beograd, where he stayed for three seasons, usually playing as a right-back. In his second season with Beograd, he played in the 2010–11 UEFA Europa League in both matches against Torpedo-BelAZ Zhodino. 

Then he moved to BSK Borča and played as a right-back, and centre-back too. After relegation of the club from the Serbian SuperLiga, he left the club and joined Sloga Petrovac. After three seasons in the second tier, he returned to the top tier to sign with Radnik Surdulica.

Lebanon 
In 2017, he played abroad in the Middle East in the Lebanese Premier League club Nejmeh. Throughout his tenure In Lebanon, he played in the 2017 AFC Cup.

Moldova  
Following his brief stint in Asia, he returned to Europe to play in the Moldovan National Division with Speranța Nisporeni. For the Moldovan side, he would appear in 7 matches and record 2 goals. He departed from Speranta during the winter of 2018.

Return to Asia 
In 2018, he joined Liga 1 Indonesia club PSIS Semarang. After a series of frequent injuries, the club decided not to renew his contract for another season. He would return to Asia in 2019 to play with Chattogram Abahani in Bangladesh.  

His third and final spell in Asia was in the Dhivehi Premier League with Maziya in 2020. He helped Maziya qualify for the 2020 AFC Cup after securing the league title.

Return to Europe 
Following his short stint in Southeast Asia, he returned to the Balkan region in 2019 to play with OFK Sloga Gornje Crnjelovo in the second tier of Bosnia. 

On 18 March 2021, he signed up for the Icelandic 1st division club Þór Akureyri. In his debut season in Iceland, he appeared in 17 matches. After a season with Akureyri, he departed from the club.

Canada 
In the summer of 2022, he played abroad in the Canadian Soccer League with the Serbian White Eagles. He helped the Serbs in securing the regular-season title including a playoff berth. Planić played in the second round of the postseason against Continentals where the White Eagles were eliminated.

Managerial career 
In 2023, he served as a coach for the Serbian White Eagles academy program.

Career statistics

References

External links
 Petar Planić stats at utakmica.rs 
 

1989 births
Living people
Sportspeople from Kraljevo
Association football defenders
Serbian footballers
Serbian expatriate footballers
OFK Beograd players
FK BSK Borča players
FK Sloga Petrovac na Mlavi players
FK Radnik Surdulica players
Nejmeh SC players
Speranța Nisporeni players
PSIS Semarang players
Maziya S&RC players
Serbian White Eagles FC players
Serbian White Eagles FC non-playing staff
Serbian First League players
Serbian SuperLiga players
Lebanese Premier League players
Moldovan Super Liga players
Liga 1 (Indonesia) players
First League of the Republika Srpska players
Canadian Soccer League (1998–present) players
Serbian expatriate sportspeople in Lebanon
Serbian expatriate sportspeople in Moldova
Serbian expatriate sportspeople in Indonesia
Serbian expatriate sportspeople in Bosnia and Herzegovina
Serbian expatriate sportspeople in the Maldives
Expatriate footballers in Lebanon
Expatriate footballers in Moldova
Expatriate footballers in Indonesia
Expatriate footballers in Bosnia and Herzegovina
Expatriate footballers in Bangladesh
Expatriate footballers in the Maldives
Þór Akureyri players
Expatriate footballers in Iceland